NGC 3928 is a lenticular galaxy in the constellation Ursa Major. It was discovered by William Herschel on March 9, 1788.

Gallery

References

External links

Ursa Major (constellation)
Lenticular galaxies
3928
037136